Islam Issa may refer to:

 Islam Issa (footballer) (born 1996), Egyptian footballer
 Islam Issa (academic), British scholar and author